Morphogenesis is an Indian architectural firm founded by Manit Rastogi and Sonali Rastogi in 1996.

History
The firm was established by Manit and Sonali Rastogi in 1996. The first project of the company was with Apollo Tyres. Manit is a Fellow of the Indian Institute of Architects and the Royal Society of Arts, UK. Manit has also been a director of Sushant School of Art and Architecture, Gurgaon (2009–2011). Manit is active in  efforts towards reclaiming the Nullahs of Delhi and transforming them into a green and sustainable network. He has also presented a proposal for rock-cut architecture for Amarnath caves.

Sonali Rastogi is a fellow at Indian Institute of Architects (IIA), the Royal Society of the Arts (RSA), UK, and was a member of the Delhi Urban Arts Commission.

Projects and work portfolio
Morphogenesis has worked with clients from various industries. Their major clients include:

Apollo Tyres
Pearl Academy, Jaipur
Infosys
Delhi Art Gallery, New Delhi
Trump Tower

Awards and accolades
AIT Awards 2012: public building (interiors)
AIT Awards 2012: Office (Interior)
AD100 Award
Scroll of Honour' Realty Plus Awards 2016
SIA-GETZ Architecture Prize 2014.
World Architecture Festival Award (2009)
CWAB Awards, India’ Top Architects (2017)
NDTV Architecture and Design Awards (2014)

References

External links 

 
Design companies established in 1996
Indian companies established in 1996